Sandra McNally (born July 1972) is an Irish economist, who is Professor of Economics at the University of Surrey and works at the Centre for Economic Performance (CEP), at the London School of Economics (LSE). Her research interests include economic evaluation of government policies in schools and further education and labor market returns to education and training.

Early life
Sandra McNally was born in Dublin. She has two half-brothers, and a sister and brother.

She has a BA in Economics from Trinity College, Dublin, studying from 1990 to 1994. She has an MSc in Environmental Economics, studying from 1994 to 1995, and a Ph.D. from University College London (UCL) in January 2003.

Career
From 1995 to 2001 Sandra McNally worked as an economist at the Centre for Ecology and Hydrology at Abbots Ripton in Cambridgeshire.

LSE
In September 2001, Sandra McNally joined the Centre for Economic Performance at the LSE. From October 2002 she also carried out work for the Centre for the Economics of Education think tank, being the Deputy Director from January 2005 to December 2009. In October 2007 she became Director of the Education and Skills Programme at the CEP.

She is the Director of the Education and Skills Programme at the CEP at the LSE, working in education economics. She carries out research into education performance. She has produced reports in conjunction with Prof Stephen Machin, the Director of the CEP.

In March 2015 she became Director of the Centre for Vocational Education Research at the LSE. The centre had been launched in March 2015; there is comparatively much less research on the FE sector in the UK than on other sectors; this sector is also described as tertiary education. There is also the Further Education Trust for Leadership, launched in 2014.

University of Surrey
In April 2012 she became Professor of Economics at the University of Surrey, in their School of Economics.

Research
McNally's area of research is economics of education; evaluation of school-level policies and post-16 education. In May 2007, she wrote a 'fact checking' report for i on education spending in the UK.

More specifically, McNally co-wrote a journal article about "The cost of just failing high stakes exams". A subtopic of her main research focus, this article focused on the long term consequences of failing a national examination in England. McNally also wrote an article in April 2020 about how effective apprenticeships are in England. This article attempted to quantify whether undertaking and apprenticeship yielded a positive return for young people entering the labor market, and how this stacks up against other paths one could take.

See also
 :Category:Education finance in the United Kingdom
 Economy of the Republic of Ireland

References

External links
 Biography at the CEP
 University of Surrey
 Centre for Vocational Education Research
 Economics of Education in Europe

1972 births
20th-century Irish economists
20th-century Irish women writers
21st-century Irish women writers
Academics of the London School of Economics
Academics of the University of Surrey
Alumni of Trinity College Dublin
Alumni of University College London
21st-century Irish economists
Irish women economists
Irish educational theorists
Irish women academics
Writers from Dublin (city)
Vocational education in the United Kingdom
Living people
Education economists